The 2022 United States House of Representatives elections in Nevada were held on November 8, 2022, to elect the four U.S. representatives from the state of Nevada, one from each of the state's four congressional districts. The elections coincided with the Nevada gubernatorial election, as well as other elections to the U.S. House of Representatives, elections to the U.S. Senate, and various state and local elections.

Redistricting

The Nevada Legislature drew new maps for Nevada's congressional districts to account for the new 2020 Census data. The Democratic Party controlled the whole redistricting process at the time. Legislators drew the maps for the state in late 2021. The maps that were eventually passed were widely criticized as partisan gerrymanders.

Overview

District 1 

The incumbent is Democrat Dina Titus, who was re-elected with 61.8% of the vote in 2020. Following redistricting, the 1st district expanded from inner Las Vegas towards its southeastern suburbs and some rural parts of Clark County, taking in the cities of Henderson and Boulder City.

Democratic primary

Candidates

Nominee 
 Dina Titus, incumbent U.S. Representative

Eliminated in primary 

Endorsements

Results

Republican primary

Candidates

Nominee 
Mark Robertson, retired U.S. Army colonel and professor

Eliminated in primary 
Jane Adams, businesswoman
David Brog, political organizer
Carolina Serrano, Hispanic outreach coordinator for Donald Trump's 2020 presidential campaign in Nevada
Morgun Sholty, businessman
Cynthia Steel, former judge for the Nevada 8th Judicial District Court
Jessie Turner, podcaster

Endorsements

Results

Independents and other parties

Candidates

Declared 
 Ken Cavanaugh (Libertarian)

General election

Predictions

Polling

Results

District 2 

The incumbent is Republican Mark Amodei, who was re-elected with 56.5% of the vote in 2020. Following redistricting, the 2nd district was expanded to include White Pine County and more of Lyon County, and includes the cities of Reno, Sparks, and Carson City.

Republican primary

Candidates

Nominee 
 Mark Amodei, incumbent U.S. Representative

Eliminated in primary 
 Joel Beck, U.S. Air Force veteran and candidate for this seat in 2018 and 2020
 Catherine Sampson
 Danny Tarkanian, Douglas County commissioner, son of Jerry Tarkanian, and perennial candidate

Results

Democratic primary

Candidates

Nominee 
Elizabeth Mercedes Krause, teacher

Eliminated in primary 
Joseph Afzal, accountant and financial analyst
Michael Doucette, teacher
Gerold Gorman, former broadcaster, software industry and teacher
Tim Hanifan, former congressional intern
Brian Hansen, slot manager
Rahul Joshi, teacher

Withdrawn 
Aaron Sims, candidate for mayor of Carson City in 2020 (running for state senate)

Results

Independents and other parties

Candidates

Declared 
 Darryl Baber (Libertarian)
 Russell Best, nominee for governor in 2018 (Independent American)

General election

Predictions

Polling

Results

District 3 

The incumbent is Democrat Susie Lee, who was re-elected with 48.8% of the vote in 2020. Following redistricting, the 3rd district expanded into much of the inner 1st district; it now comprises the western Las Vegas suburbs, including Spring Valley, Summerlin South, and Sandy Valley.

Democratic primary

Candidates

Nominee 
 Susie Lee, incumbent U.S. Representative

Eliminated in primary 
 Randy Hynes, cloud programmer

Endorsements

Results

Republican primary

Candidates

Nominee 
April Becker, attorney and nominee for Nevada's 6th Senate district in 2020

Eliminated in primary 
Clark Bossert
Albert Goldberg, real estate broker
John Kovacs, construction company owner
Noah Malgeri, veteran

Withdrew

Endorsements

Results

General election

Endorsements

Predictions

Polling 
Graphical summary

Results

District 4 

The incumbent is Democrat Steven Horsford, who was re-elected with 50.7% of the vote in 2020. Following redistricting, the 4th district now covers parts of northern Las Vegas, taking in the Las Vegas Strip, as well as its northern suburbs and rural central Nevada.

During the campaign, a research firm contracted by the Democratic Congressional Campaign Committee inappropriately obtained the military records of candidate Sam Peters.

Democratic primary

Candidates

Nominee 
 Steven Horsford, incumbent U.S. Representative

Endorsements

Republican primary

Candidates

Nominee 

Eliminated in primary 
Annie Black, state assemblywoman from the 19th district
 Chance Bonaventura, chief of staff for Michelle Fiore, a Las Vegas city councilwoman

Endorsements

Polling

Results

General election

Predictions

Polling

Results

See also
 Elections in Nevada
 Political party strength in Nevada
 Nevada Democratic Party
 Nevada Republican Party
 Government of Nevada
 2022 United States Senate election in Nevada
 2022 Nevada gubernatorial election
 2022 Nevada lieutenant gubernatorial election
2022 Nevada Senate election
2022 Nevada Assembly election
 2022 Nevada elections
2022 United States gubernatorial elections
 2022 United States elections

Notes

Partisan clients

References

External links 
Official campaign websites for 1st district candidates
 Mark Robertson (R) for Congress
 Dina Titus (D) for Congress

Official campaign websites for 2nd district candidates
 Mark Amodei (R) for Congress
 Darryl Baber (L) for Congress
 Elizabeth Mercedes Krause (D) for Congress

Official campaign websites for 3rd district candidates
 April Becker (R) for Congress
 Susie Lee (D) for Congress

Official campaign websites for 4th district candidates
 Steven Horsford (D) for Congress
 Sam Peters (R) for Congress

2022
Nevada
United States House of Representatives